Robert Jerry Bergren Sr. is a Democratic Party member of the Montana House of Representatives, representing District 33 since 2002. He previously served as Speaker of the Montana House of Representatives.

External links
Project Vote Smart – Representative Bob Bergren (MT) profile
Follow the Money – Bob Bergren
2008 2006 2004 2002 campaign contributions

Living people
Montana State University alumni
People from Havre, Montana
Speakers of the Montana House of Representatives
Democratic Party members of the Montana House of Representatives
Year of birth missing (living people)
Farmers from Montana